Harry Wheeler (1858–1900) was a baseball player.

Harry Wheeler may also refer to:

Harry A. Wheeler (1866–1960), President of the United States Chamber of Commerce
Harry C. Wheeler (1875–1925), Arizona lawman
Harry E. Wheeler (1907–1987), American geologist
A. Harry Wheeler, American mathematician

See also
Harold Wheeler (disambiguation)
Henry Wheeler (disambiguation)